Munkoyo or ibwatu is a popular drink in rural Zambia. It is a mildly fermented drink made from pounded roots mixed with bits of maize. The mixture can be drunk immediately after it is made or allowed to ferment for several days. It is often called "sweet beer" by Zambians. It is also found in central African countries like Congo where it is used as a drink in traditional ceremonies as well as an ordinary beverage.

See also

 Burukutu
 Chibuku
 Munkoyo
 Lotoko

References

Fermented drinks
Types of beer
African drinks
South African cuisine
Beer in Africa